Leandro N. Alem is a town in the , and the only municipality forming the partido (department) of the same name. At the  it had a population of 16,358 inhabitants.

The city is named after Leandro Alem (1844–1896), one of the founders of the Radical Civic Union.

References

 

Populated places in Buenos Aires Province
Cities in Argentina
Argentina